"Girl, Women and Ladies" is a song co-written and recorded by American country music artist Ed Bruce.  It was released in November 1980 as the third single from the album Ed Bruce.  The song reached No. 14 on the Billboard Hot Country Singles & Tracks chart.  Bruce wrote the song with his wife Patsy and Ron Peterson.

Chart performance

References

1981 singles
Ed Bruce songs
Songs written by Ed Bruce
Song recordings produced by Tommy West (producer)
MCA Records singles
1980 songs
Songs written by Patsy Bruce